Confey College is a co-educational interdenominational vocational school in Leixlip, County Kildare, Republic of Ireland. The school opened to 36 students in September 1986 and has approximately 770 students at present and about 50 staff members.

The school is situated at the end of the River Forest Estate. It is one of two secondary-level schools in Leixlip, the other being Coláiste Chiaráin.

History 
Before the construction of the original school building in Riverforest in 1994, Confey College teachers taught in nearby Scoil San Carlo on a part-time basis after the primary school closed for the day at 3 pm. After lobbying from teachers and parents, prefabricated buildings were provided on the site which the school currently occupies. With the growth of Leixlip and an expanding teenage population, these facilities were inadequate. With much further teacher and local pressure, what is now the older of the two school buildings was built in 1994, with three prefabs remaining in use as classrooms. The remaining prefabs were removed in 2001 with the construction of a new, larger building.

In February 2011, Mary McAleese made a presidential visit to the school in honour of its 25-year anniversary.

Musical productions 
The school produces annual musical productions. The transition year group of 2019-2020 performed the musical All Shook Up from 11 to 13 December 2019.

Green-Schools 
Confey College has a Green-Schools committee made up of students and teachers, launched in 2009. In 2017, the committee won the Water School of the Year award in the Eastern Midlands region.

Sport
Confey College have an all-weather 'astro turf' pitch. The pitches are used for school teams as well as PE.

In 2010, Confey College's futsal team won the Kildare & Leinster Post Primary Schools Futsal title. They defeated St. Peter's College of Dunboyne 1–0 in the final.

Notable alumni 
 Trevor Brennan - rugby player
 David Geraghty - musician
 Jake Carroll - footballer
 Nathan Collins - footballer

References

Leixlip
Secondary schools in County Kildare
1986 establishments in Ireland
Educational institutions established in 1986